Harry Gafney was an American football coach.  He was the head football coach at the Nichols College in Dudley, Massachusetts from 1959 to 1961.

Head coaching record

College

References

Nichols Bison football coaches